Uvarovsky is a rural locality (a khutor) in Khopyoropionerskoye Rural Settlement, Uryupinsky District, Volgograd Oblast, Russia. The population was 122 in 2010. There are two streets.

Geography 
Kriushinsky is the nearest rural locality.

References 

Rural localities in Uryupinsky District